Zombie Bums from Uranus is a novel by Australian children's author Andy Griffiths, and is the second part of Griffiths' Bum trilogy. The book was released in 2003 worldwide, however, the United States version was titled Zombie Butts from Uranus as opposed to Zombie Bums from Uranus.

Plot synopsis
The story opens with protagonist from the previous story The Day My Bum Went Psycho, Zack Freeman skiing down a "mountain", whilst repeatedly arguing with his bum. After defying death many times, Zack falls to his death off a waterfall, and then realises that he is actually in Silas Sterne's state-of-the-art bum fighting simulator. After another in what is revealed to be a long series of ear-bashings by The Kicker, Zack gives up bum-fighting and leaves the academy.

Meanwhile, up near Uranus, James and Judi Freeman have just collected a bum from Uranus, after they were found to be what made up the rings. Back on earth, Zack finds his hometown completely flattened from a Bum-blitz, excluding his Gran's house to his great relief.

References

2003 Australian novels
Novels by Andy Griffiths
Australian children's novels
Bum Trilogy
Fiction set on Uranus
Zombie novels
COOL Award-winning works
2003 children's books
Pan Books books